The 2003 Swedish Touring Car Championship season was the 8th Swedish Touring Car Championship (STCC) season. In total eight racing weekends at four different circuits were held; each round comprising two races, making a sixteen-round competition in total.

Changes for 2003
 The Supertouring regulations were removed and replaced with Super2000.
 The pitstops were also removed
 Each round were to consist of two races, with one sprint race of 15–25 minutes and one super-race approximately 15–30 minutes longer.
 Qualifying was conducted by having a standard qualifying session followed by a one-lap Superpole for the 8 fastest drivers.
 The top 15 finishers were awarded points: 20-17-15-13-11-10-9-8-7-6-5-4-3-2-1.

Teams and drivers

Race calendar and winners
All rounds were held in Sweden.

Championship results

Championship Standings

Driver's championship

Manufacturer's Championship

References

Swedish Touring Car Championship seasons
Swedish Touring Car Championship
Swedish Touring Car Championship season